Koziova — is a village located in Stryi Raion (district) of Lviv Oblast (province) in Western Ukraine. It is located in the Ukrainian Carpathians, within the limits of the Eastern Beskids (Skole Beskids). Koziova hosts the administration of Koziova rural hromada, one of the hromadas of Ukraine. Local government – Kozivska village council.

History
The first written mention of Koziova which dates from the year 1538. The first settlers were hiding in the mountains from the Mongol invasion.

Until 18 July 2020, Koziova belonged to Skole Raion. The raion was abolished in July 2020 as part of the administrative reform of Ukraine, which reduced the number of raions of Lviv Oblast to seven. The area of Skole Raion was merged into Stryi Raion.

Geography
The village is located along the Highway M06 (Ukraine). And is located along the Oriava River, is surrounded on of all parties by mountains and forests.

Attractions 
In the village is an architectural monument of local importance of Skole Raion (Skole district). It is a wooden church of St. Nicholas, 1926.

References

External links 
 weather.in.ua
 Про село Козьова 
 Козьова, Матеріал з Вікіпедії 
 Козьова

Literature 
  Page 717.

Villages in Stryi Raion